Madame de Pompadour at her Tambour Frame is a 1753-64 painting by François-Hubert Drouais showing Madame de Pompadour embroidering. It is now in the National Gallery, London. Until 1974 it was at Mentmore Towers as a part of the Rothchild collections.

External links
http://www.nationalgallery.org.uk/paintings/francois-hubert-drouais-madame-de-pompadour-at-her-tambour-frame

Collections of the National Gallery, London
1764 paintings
Pompadour
Cultural depictions of Madame de Pompadour
Women in art
Dogs in art